Taihan Cable & Solution is a Korean corporation known for manufacturing electric wires and stainless steel products for electricity and communication.  It was established in 1955 as the first wire and cable company in South Korea. It is listed on the Korean Stock Exchange under Ticker symbol 001440. The current CEO is Hyeong Kyun Na .

Operations
Taihan has a manufacturing plant in Gyeonggi-do and Chungcheongnam-do, Korea and a research center in Gyeonggi-do. It has overseas offices in South Africa, Democratic Republic of Congo, Vietnam, Hong Kong, Mongolia, the United States, Canada, United Arab Emirates, Saudi Arabia, Kuwait, Singapore, Malaysia, Thailand and Australia.

Products and Services
 Power Generation&Distribution
 Communications Cable
 Base Metal
 System
 Supply of Telephone and Optical Fiber Cable
 Ultra-high-voltage cables and connecting parts 
 Turnkey contract work for High Tension Power Cable Project

References

External link 
 Official Website

Companies listed on the Korea Exchange